Kazuo Chiba (千葉和雄 also T.K. Chiba; February 5, 1940 – June 5, 2015) was a Japanese aikido teacher and founder of Birankai International. He served for seven years as uchideshi at the Aikikai Hombu Dojo before being dispatched abroad to help develop Aikido internationally. He held an 8th dan in Aikido, issued by Aikikai world headquarters in Tokyo, Japan and was active in Aikido for over 50 years.

Biography

Early life
Kazuo Chiba was born February 5, 1940, near Tokyo, Japan. At 14 years of age, he began serious Judo training at the International Judo Academy, and also began the study of Shotokan karate at age 16. In 1958, after coming across a photo of Morihei Ueshiba in a book, he decided to dedicate himself solely to Aikido and set out to apply as an uchideshi at the main school in Tokyo. Though not accepting live-in students at the time, after much persistence Chiba was admitted as an uchideshi at the Hombu dojo in Tokyo. Most of the daily training at the Hombu dojo was conducted by Kisshomaru Ueshiba, the son of the Aikido founder; O'Sensei was frequently away from the dojo giving lectures on Aikido and Oomoto-Kyo during Chiba's stay as uchideshi. For much of his seven-year period as a live-in student, however, Chiba Sensei traveled extensively with Morihei Ueshiba as his personal assistant during travels spreading Aikido. By 1960, Chiba had received the rank of 3rd dan and was assigned to Nagoya to establish one of the first branch schools of the Aikikai headquarters, where he served as its full-time instructor. In 1962, he also began teaching at the Hombu Dojo, and within three years had completed his training as uchideshi and earned promotion to 5th Dan.

United Kingdom

During the 1964 Olympic Games held in Tokyo, a notable Judo master, Kenshiro Abbe came to Hombu Dojo to pay respects to O'Sensei. It was during this visit that he requested an instructor be dispatched to England to develop Aikido for the British Judo council. Chiba Sensei, who had been serving tea to the two masters had been supposed to go to New York to assist Yamada Sensei, but on the request O'Sensei sent him as the first representative of the Aikikai Foundation in the UK, though other teachers had gone in previously. In March 1966 he bag his voyage from the Port of Sasebo and arrived in the UK at Heathrow Airport on the 5th May 1966.

In 1970 he was promoted to 6th Dan and awarded the title Shihan, Master Instructor. In 1975, Chiba returned to Japan to serve as Secretary of the International Department at the Aikikai Hombu Dojo. During the ten years Chiba spent in the UK, he also helped to promote Aikido across Europe particularly in Belgium, France, Greece, Ireland, Italy, the Netherlands, Morocco, Spain and Switzerland.

Northumberland 

Chiba Sensei faced much racism in the post-war culture of Britain since the Japanese had been on the opposing side e.g., on arrival his luggage was turned out and he was taken to a separate room to be questioned about the purposes of his visit. He told the immigration officers that he was there to teach martial arts (which he subsequently thought was an unwise thing to do) and showed them the contract from the British Judo Council (BJC). As a result, a representative of Mr Logan, who had been with Kenshiro Abbe during the visit to Hombu Dojo and who was Chiba Sensei's sponsor, was brought in to represent the BJC and to account for Chiba Sensei's visit and after several hours he was released. After leaving the airport they went to King's Cross Station and boarded a train for Newcastle. Mr Logan intended to establish Chiba Sensei in Newcastle with mats which had been shipped on the same boat that bore him to England.

Chiba Sensei spoke limited English when he arrived in the UK. It was more than a month after arrival that Mr Logan informed him that he intended to bring home a Japanese interpreter, Mr Kimura, who spoke fluent English and worked for the company affiliated with Common Brothers Shipping - the company of which Mr Logan was an executive. This helped mediate what had become a long and lonely period in the UK, but it did not resolve many of the problems which were to occur later.

The encounter with English life was at first difficult for Chiba Sensei. The British climate was in stark contrast to his home, in particular the lack of sun caused him sleeping difficulties and Mrs Logan would wake him at 08:00 with a cup of English tea which he did not enjoy at the time, though later in life he became a great fan of Builder's tea he commented that 'I could not stop dreaming of soy sauce.' Moreover, the tradition of high tea with guests speaking 'ceaselessly' to each-other was a profound culture shock.

In early June 1966, one month after arrival, Chiba Sensei was told by Mr Logan that they had arranged for him to do a demonstration at the Northumberland Police Headquarters in Newcastle, the intention being that the police may hire him to teach a self-defense program.  The event took place at a Judo dojo near the Police Headquarters, with a dozen policemen dressed in keikogi and two high-ranking officers sat in chairs observing. The two conditions of the police were that no striking or kicking, and no bloodshed were to take place due to the police's policy against inflicting injury. For the first half hour Chiba Sensei responded to requests for defense against various attacks. Towards the end of the demonstration Chiba Sensei was asked to respond to handgun threats, one position was in the surrender pose with his hands in the air and the gun behind his head. Chiba Sensei performed shihonage and the uke landed on his head which began to bleed covering the keikogi and he was carried out by his comrades after becoming unconscious. Chiba Sensei knew that the mission had therefore been unsuccessful and he never heard from the police force subsequently.

The situation for Chiba Sensei became steadily more difficult, and a couple of weeks after the demonstration he had a long conversation with Mr Logan with the aid of Mr Kimura. During this meeting it became clear to him that there was a dire political situation preventing him from teaching Aikido in the UK,and hence the unexpected break since arriving. There were two Judo organisations in the UK: the British Judo Council (BJC) and the British Judo Association (BJA). The former was founded by Kenshiro Abbe, but the latter was recognized by the British authorities and was a member of the International Judo Federation (IJF) which was a member of the Olympic Committee that only recognizes one organisation per field, per country. The situation mirrored the history in Japan since Abbe Sensei had come from the Butotukai in Kyoto, rival to the Kodokan in Tokyo. Nonetheless, the BJC had a stronger membership (20,000 - 30,000) than the BJA, the failure after ten years to get his students recognized had caused Abbe Sensei political isolation leading to sickness which motivated his move back to Japan in 1964. However, for Hombu Dojo (then under the direction of Kisshomaru Ueshiba) Abbe Sensei was the official representative of British Aikido and therefore on his request for a teacher from the |Aikido Foundation to head the Aikido portion of his organisation, the British Aikido Council (BAC), there had been no reason to question the situation.

Apart from the political situation inherited from the Judo world, Chiba Sensei was faced with further problems from the AIkido world. In particular the BAC was headed by Ken Williams who did not know Chiba Sensei. Moreover, the BAC had Nakazono Sensei who was living in Paris, France as a technical advisory upon the request of Kenshiro Abbe. This relationship was not known of by Hombu Dojo and though Chiba Sensei had met him previously at Hombu Dojo, he had never seen him in the Aikido community and was not aware he was a teacher. Furthermore, Nakazono Sensei was a close friend of Tadashi Abe, who had been uchideshi under O'Sensei before the war and had taught aikido in France, subsequently assisting the BAC on the request of Kenshiro Abbe. It was this role which Nakazono Sensei had inherited. Chiba Sensei had been closely associated with Tadashi Abe Sensei and admired him greatly, he had even co-signed the contract with the BJC. Furthermore, Masamichi Noro, another former uchideshi and direct senior to Chiba Sensei, was also living and teaching in France and assisting Nakazono Sensei and Ken Williams with the BAC. Unfortunately Nakazono Sensei was deeply offended that he had not been consulted by Kenshiro Abbe as the head of the BAC and consequently Nakazono Sensei and Ken Williams decided to pull away from the BAC along with the entire membership to form the Renown Aikido Society. The result was that since the BJC was paying Chiba Sensei a (modest) monthly salary plus all the expenses in bring him to the UK, but was drawing no income from him, as he had been unable to teach since arrival, the organisation was losing money.

When Chiba Sensei understood the situation he requested of Mr Logan to meet with Nakazono Sensei and Noro Sensei, which was fortuitous since they had been invited to teach at the annual BJC Summer School in Chigwell. Mr Logan objected since he and Kenshiro Abbe had the intention to build the BAC from the bottom up, without these teachers involvement. In particular Kenshiro Abbe, as well as his Aikido students in the UK, had lost confidence in them due to the formation of the Renown Aikido Society in his absence. In August 1966 Chiba Sensei traveled from Newcastle to London, and Chigwell, by train and had a number of meetings with Nakazono and Noro Sensei over the course of several days. The meeting were largely fruitless as the two Japanese teachers insisted that the only resolution was for Chiba Sensei to give up his position within the BAC and instead join the Renown Aikido Society. Chiba Sensei refused, believing that it would have been a betrayal of Kenshiro Abbe and that it was a subversion of Hombu Dojo's authority in the Aikikai world. Chiba Sensei felt that the behavior of the British aikidoka was a breach of martial ethics, and his appreciation grew for the enormous difficulties Kenshiro Abbe had faced in the UK, magnified by the end of the Pacific War. He had been aware of the issues faced by the Judo politics and the decline in Kenshiro Abbe's health this had affected, but now felt unable to consult him about the present issues as he did not want to burden him further.

Chiba Sensei continually felt isolated by both the cultural separation and the growing political one and despite Mr Logan's effort's, their relationship continued to grow cold. As a result, Mr Logan suggested Chiba Sensei invite his wife Mitsuko to the UK. Chiba Sensei refused this offer since he wished to follow the terms of the contract as written, regardless Mr Logan booked her a flight to London for sometime in September 1966. Realizing that he no longer could object, Chiba Sensei felt that despite the problems associated with Mrs Chiba's untimely arrival, her coming might help open up the stagnant situation.

As tensions escalated Mr Logan and Chiba Sensei had a destructive argument frustrated by the language barrier and terminated in Chiba Sensei shouting 'Get out of here!' to which Mr Logan quite logically insisted that Chiba Sensei leave his house. Mr Logan procured him an apartment and he moved out, on the first opportunity he wrote to Mrs Chiba telling her that she must not come and should wait for a letter from him. However, he was still poor and unable to teach Aikido and therefore, increasingly restless and with a longing for the city, he decided to go to London where the vice president of the BJC, Mr Otani, put him up in his house in Acton in a room once occupied by Kenshiro Abbe. After returning to his lodgings one afternoon he received a phone-call from Mr Otani informing him that London Heathrow had called to say that Mrs Chiba had arrived. Considering that he had sent a telegram telling her not to come and knowing that Mr Logan had cancelled her flights after their dispute, the news came as a surprise. When he met her at the airport and asked her if she had received the note or had had problems getting on the flight she answered 'no' to both questions.

Chiba Sensei was unable to enjoy the event since he knew that in the current situation he could not provide her with a secure and stable living situation. It was not clear what had occurred to bring Mrs Chiba to the UK, and the relationship between Chiba Sensei and Mr Logan strained further as Mr Logan was required to pay for the flights and remained convinced that someone had-acted on Chiba Sensei's behalf to secretly put her on the plane behind his back. Chiba Sensei was offended by the suggestion, but noted that Mr Logan may have known that Mrs Chiba's father Mr Sekiya worked for the Japanese Airlines Office as a testing engineer and his close friend Mr Konami was a JAL representative in the London Office and used this information to form the conspiracy. Within a week of Mrs Chiba's arrival, Mr Logan sent documents to their apartment informing them that his three-year renewable contract with the BJC had been cancelled. Chiba Sensei was not surprised since his relationship with Mr Logan had grown frostier since Chiba Sensei regarded the other Japanese teachers as his seniors and therefore could not compete with them in the way Mr Logan intended, which Chiba Sensei believed was a slight misunderstanding of Kenshiro Abbe's wishes.

Chiba Sensei found himself in an even more desperate situation, now he had no wage and a wife to support. So he went to see the man in charge of Sunderland Physical Education, who he had met through Mr Logan. He was a former Aikidoka, and had led a SPE sponsored group that was loosely associated with the Renown Aikido Society. Chiba Sensei inquired if there would be some availability for him to teach Aikido within their programs, he was asked to return in a few days. Upon the second visit to the office Chiba sensei was informed that there were two evening classes per week available at a local school in town.  They had already been meeting for some time and were being taught by a senior ranking member (third-first kyu) who was willing to turn the classes over.  At the same time he informed Chiba Sensei that they had arranged a room for him in the house of another member, free of charge. In early October 1966, Mrs Chiba and Chiba Sensei moved into the house of the dojo member and his wife, a childless couple in their thirties. Chiba Sensei was deeply touched to be received so open heartedly and with this couple began to appreciate the real English way of life.

The classes were held at a local secondary school numbered around twenty students, and were of a mixture of men and women and ages - 'all of whom appeared to be beginners regardless of their rank'. They came from an Aikido section of a dojo in town called Sunderland Martial Arts Academy which taught Aikido, Judo and Karatedo. Sometime later the Sunderland Academy invited Chiba Sensei to teach at their dojo three times a week on a regular basis. It was a small group of about ten, and again seemingly beginners. However, there were a group of young students, 18–20 years old who were physically fit and eager to learn. The dojo became the center of Chiba Sensei teaching activity in the Northeast of England until 1968. At the same time the SPE gave him a daytime class once a week at the Monkwearmouth Technical College. As a result, after a long period of inactivity since arriving in May 1966, Chiba Sensei was fully engaged in teaching Aikido six days a week and began to report back positively to Hombu Dojo after a long silence.

In mid-October 1966 a demonstration sponsored by the local television station was held in the gymnasium of the secondary school where Chiba Sensei was conducting classes. Chiba Sensei used the student who had been leading the classes before his arrival as the uke, unfortunately he landed badly and hit his head hard enough to cause a severe concussion and was taken to hospital, successfully treated for intracranial bleeding, losing some sight in one of his eyes. Another demonstration was arranged a few weeks later by the school principal, who was a member of the evening classes. The exhibition took place at a garden house near the beach and the audience was composed entirely of elderly British ladies. Chiba Sensei took issue with martial arts being used as entertainment at a tea party, but concluded 'Well, this is England, not Japan.' and began the demonstration against his better judgement. Towards the end he demonstrated jodori, and during kotegaeshi the uke lost control of his jo which smashed the cup a lady was drinking from and caused general chaos in the crowd. As a result, there was a public outcry about the uncivilized behavior of the foreigner (Chiba Sensei) who offended the delicate ways of English Society,

Not long after the SPE refused to let a promising student, Mr Butler, attend Chiba Sensei's classes on account of misbehavior. Chiba Sensei asked them to reconsider and they had several meetings to discuss the issue, but they maintained their stance and refused to justify their position further than saying the student (who was in his 40s) was a 'bad man'. Chiba Sensei told them he would bring Mr Butler to the classes as his personal teaching assistant and stated that since the classes were open to the public and funded by the taxpayer they were obliged to keep the door open to everyone without personal discrimination. As a response he was informed that he had been fired from teaching classes sponsored by the SPE, and a few days later that he must vacate the house that the SPE had arranged.

The move was a blessing in disguise since Chiba Sensei and his wife likely were quite inconvenient for their hosts, and the room they had been generously offered was not suitable. It was cold and damp, and the only way to heat it was to constantly burn coal in the fireplace, the back-draft from which filled the room with smoke. The combination of these effects caused Chiba Sensei to develop a serious lung infection which exacerbated his asthma. Furthermore, in order to treat his illness he needed to soak in a tub of hot water to warm the body, and to ease his breathing with steam. Unfortunately the hot water reserve was limited so Mrs Chiba had to collect hot water from a pan on the stove in the kitchen.

Mid-December 1966, a few days before Christmas, Chiba Sensei visited the patron of YMCA hostel to see if there might be a room available for him and his wife. The patron said yes and  gave him special permission to have Mrs Chiba with him, which was against their male only policy. When they left their house Chiba Sensei thanked the couple for their generosity over the last three months and presented them with a camera he had bought in Japan as a thank you. The room at the YMCA was much better, having central heating and unlimited hot water. Meals were served every day morning and evening, except Sunday and holidays. Chiba Sensei's asthma soon disappeared. The other residents were college students from Asia, Africa, and the Middle East and Chiba Sensei spent much time with them to improve his English and was inspired by their hopes to participate in the future development of their various countries. On 30 December 1966 Chiba Sensei taught his last class of the year at the Monkwearmouth College, the bus ride was roughly 20 minutes long but he decided to walk so he could buy some bread and a Guinness for him and his wife's first New Year's Eve in England.

London 
On the 14 December 1967 Chiba Sensei left Newcastle Station on the 11:55 train bound for London to relocate. Three notable individuals had appeared to see him off: Mr Logan's secretary, Mr Myers of Sunderland, who had acted as his personal assistant during his stay, and his student Mr P Butler.  The move represented a certain freedom for Chiba Sensei, since it was an escape from the tangled political situation of Aikido in Britain and the power struggle.  As preparation Chiba Sensei had discarded his belongings, save his weapons, a few books, and a heavy sheepskin coat. When he arrived he met with Mr Iyengar and George Stavrou at King's Cross Station who had invited him from the North.

Soon after arrival Chiba Sensei started teaching at Busen Dojo in King's Cross, the old Judo dojo where Kenshiro Abbe had started. There were approximately twenty students practicing, most of which were associated with George Stavrou. When the mats Mr Iyengar had ordered arrived the dojo moved to a new location Seven Sisters Road in Finchley, London. The new space was a community hall rented for two nights a week until they were able to find a better and more suitable location in the Greater London Sports Club in Chiswick where they had semi-permanently laid down the tatami mats. In 1972 the dojo relocated once more into a large Church hall in Earl's Court with a better atmosphere for a dojo and remained there until Chiba Sensei left for Japan in 1976. It was during this period that Chiba Sensei began the first kenshusei program that incorporated Aikido, weapons, iaido, and Zazen.

Chiba Sensei also formed the Aikikai of Great Britain (AGB) which grew steadily and expanded into several major cities in the UK, namely Birmingham, Leicester, Sunderland, Durham, Manchester, Liverpool, Cardiff, and Glasgow. In the early 1970s Chiba Sensei had a serious commitment to development of Aikido in Europe through the European Aikido Cultural Association (ACEA), the representative organization recognized by Hombu Dojo in Europe. He managed to reestablish his relationship with Tada Sensei, who was teaching in Italy, and joined his annual International Summer Course held at Lake Grada in Northern Italy near Verona. All activities combined he was traveling somewhere in the UK or the European continent nearly every weekend of the year.

in 1975 Kisshomaru Ueshiba conducted a tour of the UK, Spain, France, Belgium, Luxembourg, Holland, Germany, Switzerland, and Monaco. It was while Nidai Doshu was in Madrid that the International Aikido Federation (IAF) was formed, and the first congress of the IAF was scheduled to be held in Tokyo in May 1976. During that interval with strong recommendation from the directing committee of the ACEA Chiba Sensei was nominated to be the first secretary of the International Affairs for Hombu Dojo.

Return to Japan
In addition to his duties within the Aikikai after returning to Japan, Chiba also began serious study of Musō Shinden-ryū iaido under Takeshi Mitsuzuka. There was a time he lived in the Ichikukai Dojo where he practiced Zen, Misogi, and received his Zen-Buddhist name Taiwa which stands first in T.K. Chiba.

United States

Chiba Sensei moved to San Diego, California in 1981 on an invitation from the United States Aikido Federation and formed the San Diego Aikikai. Under Chiba Sensei's direction, San Diego Aikikai served as the headquarters for the Western Region of the United States Aikido Federation (later Birankai North America), an organization directly affiliated and recognized by Aikido World Headquarters (Hombu Dojo)] in Tokyo, Japan. For the next twenty-seven years Chiba continued to work diligently to promote aikido worldwide by teaching numerous seminars and by creating a rigorous teacher training program for his own students. In 2008, after 50 years in Aikido, Chiba retired from active teaching.

Aikido Style
Chiba Sensei was dedicated to his master, and felt passionately about the Aikido as Budo which he learnt from O'Sensei as uchideshi. After O'Sensei died it became the position of Hombu dojo to keep Aikido accessible to all practitioners, regardless of age or physical limitations which does not contradict the principles of Aikido. However, Chiba Sensei learnt it as a (practical) martial art and rejected vehemently the idea that Aikido should become something else hence he insisted on keeping a live martial element which resulted in stylistic differences from the Aikikai foundation who were moving toward a more generic system.

All the other elements Aikido as "an art of living," as a means to better health, as calisthenics or a physical aesthetic pursuit all of these stem from a common root, which is budo. That they do so is perfectly fine, but the point is that they're not the root themselves. O-Sensei always stressed that "Aikido is budo" and "Budo is Aikido's source of power." If we forget this then Aikido will mutate into something else a so-called "art of living" or something more akin to yoga.  -- T. K. Chiba

As a result, the Aikido practiced by Chiba Sensei and his students has been known as a dynamic or martial version. Having deep respect for the Aikikai Foundation it was important for Chiba Sensei that he and his students always respect their authority in the aikikai world. Therefore, unlike other notable students of O'Sensei, Chiba Sensei did not create his own school of Aikido separate from the Aikikai, but rather a style within the community - an important distinction. Unlike Aikido practiced at Hombu Dojo, Chiba Sensei Incorporated weapons work (Bokken and Jo), Zazen, and Iaido into his style.

Weapons 
Chiba Sensei learnt the aiki-jo and aiki-ken system of Iwama-Ryu Aikido during his time there with O'Sensei and Saito Sensei, and for many years taught these. However, he subsequently adapted the forms incorporating elements of his study of Iaido and classic Japanese swordsmanship.

Zazen 
It is well documented that O'Sensei taught Aikido as an extension of his deep religious views which combined Shinto and Zen. During his time as uchideshi, Chiba Sensei was introduced to both of these elements in particular misogi and zazen, which were both practiced by O'Sensei.  However, the system of spiritual discipline he followed was based on Chinkon-Kishin (method of pacifying the soul and regaining or recovering the spirit) derived from ancient Shinto and its extension - the study of Kototama doctrine (the miraculous power of language inherent within the Japanese alphabet). Other students were also strongly influenced by this in particular the emphasis on ki by Koichi Tohei, and the Ki-no-renma system of Hiroshi Tada (who both influenced Chiba Sensei) stem from this study, all three were also heavily influenced by the breathing-system of Nakamura Tempu and regularly taught elements of it.

During his time with the founder, Chiba Sensei learnt that three principles were important for the study of Budo: religious faith, farming, and  martial discipline. He confessed himself to having 'no problem with following the practice of farming and martial discipline' and continued both throughout his life, but he 'could not avoid the increasingly strong internal resistance that, as time went on, built up within [him] toward the Founder's spiritual discipline.' In an article he later wrote that he 'suffered from an internal split and feared the loss of unity between the physical art and spiritual discipline which was supposed to be the underlying principle of the art.' It was for this reason that he took up serious zen practice and remained a devoted zen Buddhist in the Rinzai school for the rest of his life, he wrote that this was a positive turning point in his Aikido life.

Zen is a discipline bringing about a confrontation with one's own original face and man's fundamental living principle, so-called "Honrai-no-Memboku" through engaging in the most direct, simple and primordial physical act of sitting. Chiba Sense defined Aikido as a martial art in which one has to deal with one's subjectivity in relation to others, and concluded that zen can be viewed as a premise or precondition for the martial discipline. He would often call Aikido a "moving Zen". His intention was to carry out a close inquiry concerning the essence of martial discipline by injecting the element of Zen discipline into the Dojo training where the practitioners are forced to confront their own true faces by being driven into a situation where there is no escape.

During his return to Japan after the UK, Chiba Sensei underwent a serious inquiry of Iaido and Zazen (and farming) and received the Zen-Buddhist name Taiwa meaning 'demon-eyes'. When established in the United States, Chiba Sensei strongly encouraged his students to also practice zazen, and made it a regular part his own dojo's timetable. Once the network was established, Genjo Marinello of Chobo-Ji was appointed as the meditation instructor for Birankai International and conducted regular sesshin. Since zazen was only introduced after his stay in the UK, many British students did not adopt it, however devotedly following his master Chris Mooney would regularly invite Genjo for sesshin and after years of serious study became Buddhist in the same school as his master, receiving his own Buddhist name of Gyoshin meaning 'mind of eternity'. Many of the later generations of Chiba Sensei's students also made a serious study of zazen and misogi, also receiving zen-buddhist names e.g., among the full-time teachers are Jenny Flower (Greece) who revived the name 'Toko' and Robert Savoca (USA) who received the name 'Ryugan'.

Iai-Batto-Ho 
Chiba Sensei got permission to adapt forms of Muso Shiden Ryu Iaido which he studied whilst in Japan and taught these forms to his Aikido students as the Ia-Batto-Ho system.

Birankai International

In an effort to unite all of his students around the world, Chiba Sensei founded Birankai International in January 2000. This multinational organization was founded to strengthen the connections between Chiba Sensei's students worldwide and is recognized by Aikido world headquarters in Tokyo, Japan.  It includes organizations in the United Kingdom, France, Austria, Greece, Poland, Canada, United States, Chile and many other places worldwide.  Notable disciples who have pursued Aikido on a professional full-time basis include Robert Savoca of Brooklyn Aikikai, George Lyons of Bucks County Aikikai, Jenny Flowers of Athens Aikikai, and Piotr Masztalerz of Wroclaw Aikikai.

Shihankai 

The Birankai organisations of various countries have been given Hombu Official Recognition in accordance with the rules set forth in the International Regulations of Aikido World Headquarters. In order to keep the traditions of the school and preserve the art, Chiba Sensei created a shihankai of his senior students, all certified by Hombu Dojo, who give technical guidance of the various national organisations. In Europe the official meeting was on 18 January 2006, comprising Noberto Chiesa, Mike Flynn, Chris Mooney, and Gabriel Valibouze, where it was agreed that the role of the shihankai would be to:

 act as custodians for the integrity of Chiba Sensei's work for the future in Europe (UK & Continental Europe),
 be closely involved with maintaining and developing the high quality of future and existing teachers in Europe,
 look to the future and plan for the time after Chiba sensei's retirement in Europe,
 take a strategic view of Aikido within Birankai and across the world with Aikikai Hombu Dojo in Japan and other Aikido associations.

In particular since Chiba Sensei was in the US, after the dissolution of Birankai Continental Europe (BCE) and the creation of the national Birankai organisations each country had an internal shihankai composed of the Shihans who lived there, and others were appointed Shihans to oversee the technical development within the organisation. As a result, in Europe the following teachers oversee the technical development within the associated countries:

 Patrick Barthélémy - France
 Daniel Brunner - Switzerland, Poland
 Dee Chen - Britain
 Noberto Chiesa - France
 Mike Flynn - Britain, Greece, Portugal
Chris Mooney - Britain, Switzerland, Germany, Israel, Kazakhstan, Turkmenistan
 Gabriel Valibouze - France

References

External links
 Official Birankai International Homepage
 1995 interview with Aikido Journal

1940 births
2015 deaths
Japanese aikidoka
Shihan